The U.S. Post Office-Carrington in Carrington, North Dakota, United States, also known as Carrington Post Office is a post office building that was built in 1932.  It was listed on the National Register of Historic Places in 1989.

References

Colonial Revival architecture in North Dakota
Government buildings completed in 1932
Post office buildings on the National Register of Historic Places in North Dakota
National Register of Historic Places in Foster County, North Dakota
1932 establishments in North Dakota